Adrian Adolph Greenburg (March 3, 1903 – September 13, 1959), widely known as Adrian, was an American costume designer whose most famous costumes were for The Wizard of Oz and hundreds of Metro-Goldwyn-Mayer films between 1928 and 1941. He was usually credited onscreen with the phrase "Gowns by Adrian". Early in his career he chose the professional name Gilbert Adrian, a combination of his father's forename and his own.

Early life
Adrian was born on March 3, 1903, in Naugatuck, Connecticut, to Gilbert and Helena (née Pollak) Greenburg. Adrian's father Gilbert was born in New York and his mother Helena in Waterbury, Connecticut. Both sides of the family were Jewish. Joseph Greenburg and his wife Frances were from Russia, while Adolph Pollak and Bertha (née Mendelsohn) Pollak were from Bohemia and Germany, respectively.

In 1920 Adrian entered the New York School for Fine and Applied Arts (now Parsons School of Design). In 1922 he transferred to the NYSFAA Paris campus, and while there, he was contracted by Irving Berlin to design settings and costumes for Berlin's Music Box Revue of 1922–23 in New York.

Career in Hollywood

Adrian was brought to Hollywood in November 1924 by Rudolph Valentino's wife Natacha Rambova to design costumes for The Hooded Falcon. The Valentino company dissolved, and Adrian's first screen credit was for the Constance Talmadge comedy Her Sister from Paris. In 1925 Adrian was hired as a costume designer by Cecil B. DeMille's independent film studio. In 1928 DeMille moved to Metro-Goldwyn-Mayer, and Adrian was provisionally hired as a costume designer for M-G-M. After a few months, he signed a contract as head designer, ultimately remaining for thirteen years and 200 films.

Adrian worked with the biggest female stars of the day: Greta Garbo, Norma Shearer, Jeanette MacDonald, Jean Harlow, Katharine Hepburn and Joan Crawford. He designed twenty-eight Crawford films, eighteen Shearer films, and nine Harlow films. He worked with Garbo from 1928, when he arrived, until 1941, when both departed the company. The Eugénie hat he created for her film Romance became a sensation and influenced millinery styles. When Adrian emphasized Crawford's shoulders by designing outfits with shoulder pads, these created a trend.

Adrian was famous for evening gown designs, a talent displayed in The Women. Though filmed in black and white, The Women includes a Technicolor fashion show of Adrian designs. Adrian was acclaimed for the period costumes of Romeo and Juliet; the extravagant costumes of The Great Ziegfeld; and the opulent gowns of Camille and Marie Antoinette. Adrian insisted on the finest materials and workmanship for the execution of his designs, cultivating fabric manufacturers in Europe and New York.

Adrian's best known film is The Wizard of Oz, for which he designed the red-sequined ruby slippers worn by Judy Garland.

Adrian left MGM on September 5, 1941, to open his own fashion firm. Adrian had contemplated leaving MGM for a year or two, upset with budgetary retrenchments caused by the Great Depression and changes in public taste. He had a serious disagreement with director George Cukor, producer Bernard Hyman, and MGM head Louis B. Mayer over the style of costumes Greta Garbo should wear in the upcoming Two-Faced Woman, which began preproduction about April 1941. Adrian apparently resolved to leave the studio after this disagreement. He notified MGM of his decision on July 16, 1941. Adrian's departure from the studio came as a shock to Louis B. Mayer. Adrian's last day was to have been August 15, but he offered to stay on to wrap up various projects. Mayer kept him on the payroll until September 5. Adrian was not terminated by MGM, nor did he resign; his three-year contract merely expired. Robert Kalloch, Columbia Pictures' chief costume and fashion designer, was named Adrian's replacement largely because his designs strongly resembled Adrian's.

Adrian continued to design fashions for the occasional film project through the 1940s, most notably for Humoresque in 1946.

Sexuality and marriage

Adrian married Janet Gaynor on August 14, 1939. Gaynor had been unmarried for six years since her previous marriage had ended. This relationship has been called a lavender marriage, since Adrian was openly gay within the film community while Gaynor was rumored to be gay or bisexual. Both Adrian and Gaynor went on record to say they were happily married, and they remained so until his death in 1959. Gaynor and Adrian had one son, Robin (born July 6, 1940).

Designer of American fashion

In 1942 Adrian established Adrian, Ltd., at 233 North Beverly Drive, Beverly Hills, in the building formerly occupied by the Victor Hugo restaurant. (He had been courted by retailers to design for public sale but rebuffed those offers. In 1932 Macy's Cinema Shop had copied his work with the studio's tacit approval, much in the same way that department stores produced so-called "Paris fashions," which were unapproved copies of French couturiers' works.)

Adrian's fashion line filled the gap left by Paris, which could not export during the German occupation. American women responded to Adrian's clean-lined designs, and he exerted a strong influence on American fashion until the late 1940s.

Adrian returned to M-G-M in 1952 for one film, Lovely to Look At. He was never nominated for an Academy Award as the costume category did not exist during the time of his major work for the studios.

Illness, retirement, and death

Adrian was stricken with a heart attack in 1952. Because he never assigned work to assistants, preferring to do all drafts and designs himself, the business could not be continued under his name. Consequently, he was forced to close Adrian, Ltd.

Adrian and his wife Janet bought a fazenda (ranch) in Anápolis, in the state of Goiás, in the interior of Brazil. They spent a few years developing it, frequently in the company of their friends Richard Halliday and Mary Martin.

In 1958 Adrian came out of retirement to design costumes for At the Grand, a musical version of the 1932 film Grand Hotel that starred Paul Muni and Viveca Lindfors and played only in Los Angeles and San Francisco.

In 1959 Adrian was hired to design costumes for the upcoming Broadway musical Camelot. While at work on this project in his studio, Adrian suffered a fatal heart attack. He was posthumously awarded the Tony Award for Best Costume Design in a Musical. He is buried in Hollywood Forever Cemetery.

Selected filmography

 Cobra (1925)
 Her Sister from Paris (1925)
 The Eagle (1925)
 The Volga Boatman (1926)
 Fig Leaves (1926)
 For Alimony Only (1926)
 Young April (1926)
 Gigolo (1926)
 The Little Adventuress (1927)
 Vanity (1927)
 His Dog (1927)
 The Country Doctor (1927)
 The Fighting Eagle (1927)
 The Angel of Broadway (1927)
 The Wise Wife (1927)
 Dress Parade (1927)
 The Forbidden Woman (1927)
 The Wreck of the Hesperus (1927)
 The Main Event (1927)
 My Friend from India (1927)
 Chicago (1927)
 Almost Human (1927)
 A Ship Comes In (1928)
 Let 'Er Go, Gallegher (1928)
 What Price Beauty? (1928)
 Stand and Deliver (1928)
 The Blue Danube (1928)
 Midnight Madness (1928)
 Skyscraper (1928)
 Walking Back (1928)
 The Masks of the Devil (1928)
 Dream of Love (1928)
 A Lady of Chance (1928)
 A Woman of Affairs (1928)
 A Single Man (1929)
 Wild Orchids (1929)
 The Bridge of San Luis Rey (1929)
 The Godless Girl (1929)
 The Trial of Mary Dugan (1929)
 The Last of Mrs. Cheyney (1929)
 The Single Standard (1929)
 Our Modern Maidens (1929)
 The Unholy Night (1929)
 The Thirteenth Chair (1929)
 The Kiss (1929)
 Untamed (1929)
 Dynamite (1929)
 Their Own Desire (1929)
 Devil-May-Care (1929)
 Marianne (1929)
 Not So Dumb (1930)
 Anna Christie (1930)
 A Lady to Love (1930)
 A Lady's Morals (1930)
 Montana Moon (1930)
 This Mad World (1930)
 The Divorcee (1930)
 Redemption (1930)
 The Rogue Song (1930)
 In Gay Madrid (1930)
 The Lady of Scandal (1930)
 The Florodora Girl (1930)
 Our Blushing Brides (1930)
 Let Us Be Gay (1930)
 Romance (1930)
 Private Lives (1931)
 Possessed (1931)
 A Free Soul (1931)
 Laughing Sinners (1931)
 Grand Hotel (1932)
 Red Dust (1932)
 Letty Lynton (1932)
 Smilin' Through (1932)
 Huddle (1932)
 Strange Interlude (1932)
 Today We Live (1933)
 Beauty for Sale (1933)
 Stage Mother (1933)
 Dinner at Eight (1933)
 Queen Christina (1933)
 The Cat and the Fiddle (1934)
Forsaking All Others (1934)
 The Barretts of Wimpole Street (1934)
 The Merry Widow (1934)
 Nana (1934)
 Naughty Marietta (1935)
 Anna Karenina (1935)
 I Live My Life (1935)
 Rose Marie (1936)
 Wife vs. Secretary (1936)
 Love on the Run (1936)
 The Great Ziegfeld (1936)
 Romeo and Juliet (1936)
 San Francisco (1936)
 The Gorgeous Hussy (1936)
 Born to Dance (1936)
 Camille (1937)
 Double Wedding (1937)
 The Last of Mrs. Cheyney (1937)
 Maytime (1937)
 Conquest (1937)
 The Firefly (1937)
 The Girl of the Golden West (1938)
 The Shopworn Angel (1938)
 Sweethearts (1938)
 Marie Antoinette (1938)
 The Wizard of Oz (1939)
 Balalaika (1939)
 The Women (1939)
 Strange Cargo (1940)
 New Moon (1940)
 Susan and God (1940)
 The Philadelphia Story (1940)
 Pride and Prejudice (1940)
 Boom Town (1940)
 When Ladies Meet (1941)
 Two-Faced Woman (1941)
 Ziegfeld Girl (1941)
 Woman of the Year (1942)
 Flight for Freedom (1943)
 Slightly Dangerous (1943)
 Humoresque (1946)
 Possessed (1947)
 Rope (1948)
 Lovely to Look At (1952)

References

Bibliography
 Adrian: A Lifetime of Movie Glamour, Art and High Fashion, by Author Leonard Stanley, Foreword by Robin Adrian, Text by Mark A. Vieira

Further reading

External links

 
 
 
 
 Adrian Hollywood Designer dress

American costume designers
American fashion designers
California people in fashion
1903 births
1959 deaths
Burials at Hollywood Forever Cemetery
Jewish American artists
Jewish fashion designers
People from Hollywood, Los Angeles
People from Naugatuck, Connecticut
American people of Czech-Jewish descent
American people of German-Jewish descent
American people of Russian-Jewish descent
Parsons School of Design alumni
20th-century American Jews